Fernando da Silva Almeida (born 10 April 1967) is a retired Brazilian football striker.

References

1967 births
Living people
Brazilian footballers
Atlético Clube Goianiense players
S.C. Salgueiros players
F.C. Maia players
Ermesinde S.C. players
Association football forwards
Primeira Liga players
Brazilian expatriate footballers
Expatriate footballers in Portugal
Brazilian expatriate sportspeople in Portugal
Sportspeople from Goiás